Lucia Chandamale (born June 18, 1988, in Lilongwe) is a Malawian athlete, who specialized in long-distance running. She represented Malawi at the 2008 Summer Olympics in Beijing, and competed for the women's 5,000 metres. She ran in the first heat of the event, against sixteen other competitors, including Ethiopia's Tirunesh Dibaba, who won the gold medal in the final round. Chandamale finished and completed the race in fifteenth place, with a time of 16:44.09, nearly nine seconds slower than her personal best of 16:35.75.

Chandamale also reached the final in the same category for a tenth-place finish at the 2006 Commonwealth Games in Melbourne, Australia, with a time of 17:10.46.

References

External links

NBC 2008 Olympics profile

Malawian female long-distance runners
Living people
Commonwealth Games competitors for Malawi
Athletes (track and field) at the 2006 Commonwealth Games
Olympic athletes of Malawi
Athletes (track and field) at the 2008 Summer Olympics
People from Lilongwe
1988 births